Fisichella is an Italian surname, originally from Sicily, currently present in around 130 Italian municipalities.

Etymology and history 

It originated in the outskirts of Catania during the Middle Ages, probably to indicate the daughter of a physician.

Between the 19th and the 20th century, the surname spread to Lombardy and Lazio.

People named Fisichella 

Notable people with this family name include:
 Domenico Fisichella, chaplain of Misterbianco
 Francesco Fisichella, ambassador of the city of Catania to the royal court of Madrid since 1671
 Giuseppe Fisichella, justice of the Supreme Court of the Kingdom of Sicily in 1770, 1771, 1772 and 1782
  (born 1841), priest, philosopher and jurist
 Domenico Fisichella (born 1935), academic and politician
 Salvatore Fisichella (born 1943), operatic tenor
 Rino Fisichella (born 1951), academic, theologian and archbishop of the Roman Catholic Church
 Giancarlo Fisichella (born 1973), racing driver
 Dimitri Fisichella (born 1974), television presenter and pitchman
 Marc Fisichella, art director and production designer.
 Alec Fisichella, starring in tv series - My Big Fat Fabulous Life, Filthy Rich - and films - Ma, All My Life, Breaking News in Yuba County.

References

See also 
 Fisichella family

External links 
 

Occupational surnames
Italian-language surnames
Latin-language surnames
 Surname